The Witcham Gravel helmet is a Roman auxiliary cavalry helmet from the first century AD. Only the decorative copper alloy casing remains; an iron core originally fit under the casing, but has now corroded away.  The cap, neck guard, and cheek guards were originally tinned, giving the appearance of a silver helmet encircled by a gold band. The helmet's distinctive feature is the presence of three hollow bosses, out of an original six, that decorate the exterior. No other Roman helmet is known to have such a feature. They may be a decorative embellishment influenced by Etruscan helmets from the sixth century BC, which had similar, lead-filled bosses, that would have deflected blades.

The helmet was discovered during peat digging in the parish of Witcham Gravel, Cambridgeshire, perhaps during the 1870s. It was said to have been found "at a depth of about four feet", although the exact findspot within Witcham Gravel is unknown; at the time, the parish comprised about 389 acres. The helmet was first published in 1877, when, owned by Thomas Maylin Vipan, it was exhibited to the Society of Antiquaries of London. When Vipan died in 1891, the British Museum purchased it from his estate. It remains in the museum's collection, and as of 2021 is on view in Room 49.

Description 
The helmet primarily comprises eight components: a skull cap, a brow piece, an occiput, a neck guard, two raised ear protectors, and two cheek guards, of which one remains. The surviving pieces are made of copper alloy; the cap, neck guard, and cheek guards were tinned, creating the appearance of a gold band surrounding a silver helmet. Originally they were attached to an iron core by two rivets on either side, six along the neck guard, and one split pin at front and at back, but the iron now remains only as corrosion.

The surviving pieces of the helmet are almost entirely decorative, and would have imparted very little protection by themselves. They are made of thin metal, proving an easy medium for repoussé work. Four semicircular designs were made with repoussé punch marks, two each on the brow piece and the occiput. Lines of repoussé work were also punched across the join between the neck guard and occiput, and at the top of the occiput and brow piece. The unique feature of the helmet, not known on any other Roman helmet, is the presence of three hollow bosses on the neck guard. These were both soldered and riveted on; the latter attachments would also help hold the copper alloy components to the iron core. Circular remnants suggest that other bosses were placed above each ear, and over the split pin at the front. Five small bosses were likewise riveted to the ornate cheek guards, already featuring repoussage depicting naturalistic ears. None of these bosses survive, although their impressions remain.

The helmet would have also had a crest. The box would have been made of organic materials such as wood filled with horsehair, and has since decayed.

Discovery 

The helmet was discovered, perhaps in the 1870s, during peat digging in Witcham Gravel. By 1877 the helmet was in the possession of Thomas Maylin Vipan, and on 17 May it was exhibited to the Society of Antiquaries of London by Augustus Wollaston Franks. In June 1880 the helmet was again loaned, this time to the Royal Archaeological Institute, which exhibited it in a two-week-long "Exhibition  of  helmets  and mail." A write-up in The Academy termed it "a Roman helmet of great interest", and suggested that the unusual design had been made in Italy.

Display 
Thomas Vipan died on 23 August 1891. That November the British Museum bought the helmet from the Rollin & Feuardent auction house, who sold it on instructions from Vipan's estate. The helmet has remained in the museum's collection since then. In 1993 it was displayed at the Abbaye de Daoloas (fr) by Quimper in France, where it was part of the exhibition "Rome face aux Barbes" from 18 June to 26 September. As of 2021 the helmet is on view in Room 49 of the British Museum.

Typology 

The helmet was likely produced around the third quarter of the first century AD, based on the size and steep angle of the neck guard. It is broadly classified as an auxiliary cavalry helmet—type B, according to the typology put forward by H. Russell Robinson. It is the sole surviving example of type B helmets; though similar to type A helmets, which are hemispherical, with recesses for the ears and small neck-flanges extending from the occiput, it has a larger, sloping neck guard. Although the bosses on the helmet have no known Roman parallel, their origin may trace to Etruscan helmets from around the sixth century BC. Examples from near the Picenum region of the Adriatic coast—and now found in the Metropolitan Museum of Art, the University of Pennsylvania Museum of Archaeology and Anthropology, and the British Museum—have similar bosses. These examples are filled with lead, which would have helped deflect blades; the bosses on the Witcham Gravel helmet are hollow, by contrast, suggesting a decorative function.

References

Bibliography 
  
  
  
  
  
  
  
  
 
  
  

1st-century works
1870s archaeological discoveries
Ancient Roman helmets
Archaeological artifacts
Archaeological discoveries in the United Kingdom
Individual helmets
Roman archaeology
Romano-British objects in the British Museum
Roman Armour from Britain